Love at First Child (original title: Ange et Gabrielle) is a 2015 French romantic comedy film directed by Anne Giafferi and starring Isabelle Carré and Patrick Bruel. The screenplay by Anne Giafferi and Anne Le Ny is based on a play by Murielle Magellan.

Cast 
 Isabelle Carré as Gabrielle
 Patrick Bruel as Ange
 Alice de Lencquesaing as Claire
 Thomas Solivéres as Simon
 Carole Franck as Caroline
 Laurent Stocker as Guillaume
 Louise Coldefy as Élodie

References

External links 
 

2015 films
2015 romantic comedy films
2010s French-language films
French romantic comedy films
French films based on plays
2010s French films